Idmon bicolora is a butterfly in the family Hesperiidae. It was described by XL. Fan and M. Wang in 2007. It is found in China (it was described from Ruyuan County in Guangdong).

References

Butterflies described in 2007
Ancistroidini